The Roman Dam of Pego da Moura is a small buttress dam situated in the municipality of Grândola in the Setúbal District of Portugal.

Description
The dam was constructed during the middle of the Roman occupation of Portugal. Built in two phases, it consists of a rectilinear wall that was originally about 40 metres long. The ruins have a maximum height of 3 m. and a thickness of 2.90 m. There are six downstream buttresses that are 2.50 m. apart, which are around 2.70 m. thick and 2.90 m long. There is also a semi-circular well, built in masonry, which probably comes from a later period. The dam was almost entirely constructed using opus incertum. In the middle there is a vaulted chamber for which opus signinum was used. Traces of a water mill can be identified.

The dam is located on a small stream and has an approximate watershed of just 2.3 km2. The area of water that could be dammed was around 0.12 km2. The small size means that researchers have concluded that the dam served agricultural purposes, despite evidence of aqueducts in the area.

Archaeological investigations
The dam was first noted by Father Carvalho Costa in 1712 in his work, Corographia Portugueza. However, it was not until the 1990s that a brief archaeological study was conducted. Formal classification was concluded in 1996, after which a more detailed archaeological study was started.

See also
 List of Roman dams and reservoirs
 Roman Dam of Belas
 Muro Dam

References

Archaeological sites in Setúbal District
Ancient Roman buildings and structures in Portugal
Roman archaeology
Ancient Roman dams